Lokanathan IAS is a 2005 Indian Malayalam language film starring Kalabhavan Mani in the lead role. It was released on 16 September 2005.

Plot
Lokanathan, who witnessed his father's murder at a young age, grows up to become an auto-rickshaw diver, the hero of his slum. His father's murderer, a Politician called Brahmanandan, becomes a minister causing harm to the people who elected him. Lokanathan, by the advice of others becomes an IAS officer.

Brahmanandan introduces his niece Durga, an IPS officer, to fight Lokanathan. Soon, Lokan is thrown out from his position. He is fought by the goons of Brahmanandan. But he is saved by Durga, who turns a new leaf and becomes his helper. Later, Lokanathan won the hearts of many people and became an MLA. Brahmanandan, who notes her change, kidnaps and kills Lokanathan's sister in front of him. The film ends with Lokanathan smashing the goons of Brahmanandan, and finally killing him.

Cast

Kalabhavan Mani as Lokanathan
Harisree Ashokan as Ajayan, Lokanathan's friend
Gayatri Jayaraman as Durga IPS, Brahmanandan's niece
T. G. Ravi as Com. Pappan, Lokanathan's father
KPAC Lalitha as Lokanathan's mother
Suja Karthika as Lokanathan's sister
Kalasala Babu as Hamsa
Sadiq as Chandrashekharan
Anil Murali as Santhosh
Nishanth Sagar as Aravindan
Ranjith as Bramanadan
V. K. Sreeraman as Hassan Haji

References

2005 films
2000s Malayalam-language films